Thomas Ward (ca. 1759 - March 4, 1842) represented New Jersey's 1st congressional district in the United States House of Representatives from 1813 to 1817.

Born in Newark, New Jersey, Ward completed preparatory studies.
He studied law.
He was admitted to the bar and commenced practice in Newark, New Jersey.
He served as captain and major in the state militia during the Whiskey Rebellion in 1794.
He served as Sheriff of Essex County, New Jersey, in 1797.

Ward was elected one of the judges of the Essex County Court in 1804 and reelected in 1809.
He served as member of the New Jersey Legislative Council in 1808 and 1809 serving as Vice-President of Council in the latter year.

Ward was elected as a Democratic-Republican to the Thirteenth and Fourteenth Congresses (March 4, 1813 – March 3, 1817).
He was a general and senior officer of the New Jersey Cavalry at the time of his death in Newark, New Jersey, March 4, 1842.
He was interred in the First Presbyterian Church Cemetery in Newark.

Ward purchased a number of properties in Otsego and St. Lawrence counties in New York from James Fenimore Cooper. The former Ward estate in Newark is the site of St. Patrick's Pro-Cathedral.

References

External links

Thomas Ward at The Political Graveyard

1759 births
1842 deaths
New Jersey sheriffs
Members of the New Jersey Legislative Council
New Jersey lawyers
Politicians from Newark, New Jersey
American militia officers
Democratic-Republican Party members of the United States House of Representatives from New Jersey
New Jersey Whigs
19th-century American politicians
Lawyers from Newark, New Jersey
19th-century American lawyers
Military personnel from New Jersey